Nataliya Galkina (born 11 August 1973) is a Kazakhstani water polo player. She competed in the women's tournament at the 2000 Summer Olympics.

References

1973 births
Living people
Kazakhstani female water polo players
Olympic water polo players of Kazakhstan
Water polo players at the 2000 Summer Olympics
Sportspeople from Karaganda